Gutenborner is a white German wine grape that is also used in English wine production. The grape was created in 1928 by Heinrich Birk at Forschungsanstalt Geisenheim by crossing of Müller-Thurgau and Bicane (also known as Chasselas Napoleon).

The only synonym of Gutenborner is its breeding code, Geisenheim 17–52.

References

White wine grape varieties